Khuda Kasam is a Hindi-language action drama film, directed by K C Bokadia and produced by Amit Kumar Bokadia. The film was released on 26 November 2010 under the Sangeeta Pictures banners. The film was earlier titled "The Challenge".

Plot
Neetu Singh is a CBI officer who is investigating murder of the Chief Minister of Maharashtra. The Chief Minister was murdered by state's home Minister Bhavani Prasad Lalla (BPL) in collusion with ACP Waghmare and jailer Lalkaar Singh. Hussain, an honest Muslim truck driver who is forced to take on the system when he is falsely implicated in a crime by BPL, as Hussain was working as a truck driver for BPL's business and he got to know that BPL was using him to transport illegal weapons and Hussain threatened that he would inform the police.  While investigating the murder, Neetu Singh threatens to expose BPL and he gets Neetu Singh herself implicated in CM's murder where she is sentenced to 5 years of rigorous imprisonment. She is tortured a lot in the jail and she tries to escape from the jail. Baghmare shoots her when she is on the run and she uses this to fake her death. Later she reappears as a London-based singer by the name Madonna in the movie, mainly as a ploy to woo and get close to BPL. She tricks BPL to kill Baghmare and seeing this Lalkaar Singh surrenders himself to police. Finally, Neetu Singh kills BPL and takes her revenge. The movie has political and social theme as its backdrop.

Cast
Sunny Deol as Hussain
Tabu as CBI officer Neetu Singh
Farida Jalal as Fatima
Govind Namdeo as SP Waghmare
Ashish Vidyarthi as Home Minister Bhawani Prasad Lala
Mukesh Rishi Inspector Lalkaar Singh
Daisy Shah as item number
Beena Banerjee as Shanti
Sadashiv Amrapurkar as Public Prosecutor
Dinesh Hingoo as Sitaram Gidwani
Raza Murad as CBI Chief Sawant

Soundtrack

References

External links
 Official website
 
 

2010 films
2010s Hindi-language films
Indian action drama films
Films directed by K. C. Bokadia
2010 action drama films